Stauromedusae are the stalked jellyfishes. They are the sole living members of the class Staurozoa and belong to the medusozoa subphylum of Cnidaria. They are unique among medusa jellyfish in that they do not have an alternation of polyp and medusa life cycle phases, but are instead interpreted as an attached medusa stage. With a lifestyle more resembling that of polypoid forms. They have a generally trumpet-shaped body, oriented upside-down in comparison with other jellyfish, with the tentacles projecting upwards, and the stalk located in the centre of the umbrella.

Members of this class are commonly found in relatively cold waters, close to the shoreline.
Sexually mature stauromedusae free-spawn eggs or sperm, which fertilize in the sea and form a creeping, unciliated planula larva. The larvae crawl across the sea floor and find a suitable place, attaching themselves typically to rock or algae, where they eventually develop into a new, attached stauromedusa. Unlike most scyphozoan jellyfish that practice strobilation, or the process of dividing themselves into body segments, which become new individuals, nearly all stauromedusae develop directly into the adult form.  Its primary source of food is small organisms, such as copepods, chironomid fly larvae, podocopid ostracods, amphipods, etc. The tendency for the amount of prey consumed increases with the size of the medusae.

Gallery

References

Bibliography 
 Introduction to Stauromedusae
 Jellyzone
 Brief classification University of Michigan
 List of all known species of Stauromedusae
 [Zagal, C. J. (2004). Diet of the stauromedusa Haliclystus auricula from southern Chile. Journal of the Marine Biological Association of the United Kingdom, 84(2), 337-340.]

External links
Staurozoan: The Stalked Jellyfish | Smithsonian Ocean Portal

 
Staurozoa
Ediacaran first appearances
Taxa named by Ernst Haeckel